Taridius is a genus of beetles in the family Carabidae, containing the following species: The genus was described by Chaudoir in 1875.

 Taridius andrewesi Emden, 1937 
 Taridius birmanicus (Bates, 1892) 
 Taridius birmanicus Bates, 1892 
 Taridius jendeki Kirschenhofer, 2010 
 Taridius niger Andrewes, 1935 
 Taridius nilgiricus Andrewes, 1935 
 Taridius opaculus Chaudoir, 1875 
 Taridius pahangensis (Kirschenhofer, 2003 
 Taridius sabahensis (Kirschenhofer, 2003) 
 Taridius stevensi Andrewes, 1923 
 Taridius vietnamensis (Kirschenhofer, 1996) 
 Taridius wrasei Kirschenhofer, 2010

Biology

Species of the Carabidae, including the genus Taridius, are predatory ground beetles.  The adults can fly but may not choose to do so.  They have biting mouthparts, a flattened body shape and hard, protective elytra covering the membranous hind wings.  Both adults and larvae are predators although they may also eat some plant matter and are probably scavengers as well. Adults often shelter under objects during the day and emerge at night to hunt.  These beetles can usually be found under the bark of trees or in the foliage, under rocks and rotten logs or in crevices in the ground. Taridius species are mainly found in tropical habitats in South East Asia.

References

Lebiinae